Piotr Zborowski (died 13 September 1580) was a Polish voivode of Sandomierz (since 1568), voivode and starosta of Kraków (since 1574), castellan (kasztelan) of Biecz (since 1565) and castellan of Wojnicz (since 1567). He made an essential role in Polish–Lithuanian negotiations about elections of Henryk Walezy and Stefan Batory.

See also
Zborowski family

References
 

16th-century births
1580 deaths
Piotr Zborowski